Novyye Tatyshly (Yañı Täteşle) is a rural locality (a selo) and the administrative centre of Novotatyshlinsky Selsoviet, Tatyshlinsky District, Bashkortostan, Russia. The population was 550 as of 2010. There are 4 streets.

Geography 
Novyye Tatyshly is located 10 km southeast of Verkhniye Tatyshly (the district's administrative centre) by road. Malaya Balzuga is the nearest rural locality.

References 

Rural localities in Tatyshlinsky District